Yang Xiufeng (Chinese: 杨秀峰; Pinyin: Yáng Xiùfēng; February 24, 1897 – c. November 10, 1983) was a Chinese politician and the President of the Supreme People's Court of China.

Biography
Yang Xiufeng was born in Qian'an, Hebei in 1897.  He was educated in the Beijing Normal School in 1916.  He was the President of the Supreme People's Court of China from 1965 to 1975, and Vice Chairman of Chinese People's Political Consultative Conference from 1980 to 1983.

External links
 Yang Xiufeng's profile

1897 births
1983 deaths
People from Tangshan
Presidents of the Supreme People's Court
Governors of Hebei
Vice Chairpersons of the National Committee of the Chinese People's Political Consultative Conference
20th-century Chinese judges